Acronicta hercules is a moth of the family Noctuidae. It is found in the Korean Peninsula, China, Japan, the Russian Far East  (Primorye, southern Khabarovsk, southern Amur region), Taiwan and Sri Lanka.

External links
Korean Insects

Acronicta
Moths of Asia
Moths described in 1874